The Motrul Sec is a right tributary of the river Motru in Romania. It flows into the Motru in the village Motru Sec.

References

Rivers of Romania
Rivers of Gorj County